Michel Sauthier (born 17 February 1966) is a retired Swiss football defender.

Honours

Player
FC Sion
Swiss Championship: 1991–92
Swiss Cup: 1985–86, 1990–91

References

1966 births
Living people
Swiss men's footballers
FC Sion players
Servette FC players
Association football defenders
Swiss Super League players
Switzerland international footballers
Swiss football managers
Servette FC managers